Seyyedabad (also Romanized as Seyyedābād and Saīyīdābād) is a village in Khoshkrud Rural District, in the Central District of Zarandieh County, Markazi Province, Iran. At the 2006 census, its population was 56, in 23 families.

References 

Populated places in Zarandieh County